Van Brabant is a surname. Notable people with the surname include:

Ozzie Van Brabant (born 1926), Canadian baseball player
Piet Van Brabant (1932–2006), Belgian journalist
Jozef Martin Paul van Brabant (1942–2006), Belgian economist

Surnames of Dutch origin